Abeykoon Mudiyanselage Thalatha Abeykoon (born 17 July 1937 – died 17 September 2003 as ) [Sinhala]), popularly as Thalatha Gunasekara, was an actress in Sri Lankan cinema. She is the mother of popular actress Nadeeka Gunasekara.

Personal life
Gunasekara was born on 17 July 1937 in Gampola, Kandy, Sri Lanka as the eldest of the family with five siblings. Her father, Tikiri Banda Abeykoon from Gampola was a Government Health Inspector. Her mother, Leelawathi Abeykoon Menike had the longest surname in the history of Sri Lanka castes where her birth name was Akkada Mukkada Weera Rambukkada Rambuke Jayagath Diyathilaka Koralege Ilanganthilaka Mudiyanselage Leelawathi Ilanganthilaka. It was a noble caste of Kandy who paid homage to the Sacred Tooth Relic with jasmine flowers. Thalatha had two younger sisters, Sita and Sri Kanthi; and two younger brothers, Senarath and Sena.

She received her primary education at Kingswood College, Kandy. After that, she studied at Hillwood College, Kandy amidst the strict rules of his parents. At school, she studied western music and got prizes for playing the piano.

She was married to Dissanayake Wijesuriya Stanley Gunasekara from Udahenatenna. He worked at Nawalapitiya and Pussellawa post offices. He later served as the Deputy Postmaster General. The couple had one son: Priyantha and four daughters: Nadeeka, Ganga, Vidya and Yamuna, all are actresses. Stanley died on 18 April 2010.

Nadeeka was born on 13 May 1958 in Kandy. In 1973, she attended Pushpadana Girls' College, Kandy and finally to Vishaka College, Bandarawela. She completed A/L from the art stream in Mahamaya Girls' College, Kandy. She is married to businessman Suren Hapuarachchi and in 2004, the couple had one daughter, Thenuki Sehansa. She is an actress who starred in several popular blockbuster films in Sinhala cinema including; Kanchana, Chanchala Rekha, Biththi Hathara, Thani Tharuwa, Ahinsa, Oba Mata Wiswasai, Angara Dangara and Daruwane.

Nadeeka's sister Ganga acted in the films Adishtana, Okkoma Rajawaru and Kanchana. Vidya acted in the films Adishtana and Me Desa Kumatada whereas and Yamuna acted in the teledrama Hingana Kolla.

She died on 17 September 2003 at the age of 66.

Early life
After passing the Senior Examination in English medium, she went to Zahira College, Gampola to do further University Entrance. While studying at University Entrance, the principal assigned to teach senior students as well. At the age of 17, she received her first appointment as an English Assistant Teacher at St. Andrew's College, Nawalapitiya where she got to teach her peers. Some popular students were Jenny Winifrida (film actress) and K.S. Venkat (Film Director) and Ahangama Piyasena (Film Actors). In 1957, she was appointed as an English teacher in the Government College, Pussellawa.

Cinema career
Thalatha became interested in acting in a film after seeing Rukmani Devi's performance. This passion grew up when she saw Wimala Vanzia, a friend who lived in Gampola, playing the lead role in the film Dingiri Menika in 1955. One day Wimala forcibly asked Thalatha for a photo and sent it to the producer of the film Deiyanne Rate, S. V. D. S. Somaratnethe. Then Somaratne sent the photo to director Ramachandran. Later, she was cast in the lead role of 'Katherine', but she did not get the chance because of her parents' strong reluctance.

After her marriage, she received an invitation from renowned filmmaker Lester James Peries. During this time the filming of 'Gamperaliya' has begun. She was selected for the role 'Nanda' in the film. However, she lost the role because she is taller than Gamini Fonseka and Henry Jayasena who played the lead roles.

After few years, she sent an application for a film that Cinemas was producing without a name after seen an advertisement in the 'Sunday Observer' newspaper. In 1963, she made her maiden cinema appearance with the film Adata Wadiya Hitha Hondai directed by Indian filmmaker Masthan. In the film, she played the kind wife of the villain played by Christy Leonard Perera. Her first lead role came through the film Sapatha Soya as a wife beaten by a drunken husband.

Then she appeared in several early Sinhala films including, Suba Sarana Sepa Sithe, Samiya Birindage Deviyaya and Patachara. Some of her most dramatic roles came through the film Abhirahasa where she plays the stepmother who falls in love with Vijaya Kumaratunga, a servant of a wealthy household. Then she made a critically acclaimed role of 'Namakka' in the film Podi Malli. Then she appeared several blockbuster films such as Nidhanaya, Sikuruliya, Davena Pipasaya, Hathara Denama Surayo, Hingana Kolla, Sadahatama Oba Mage, Apeksha, Nomiyena Minisun and Maldeniye Simion.

In 1998, she became a film producer and screenwriter with the 1998 film Aye Obata Barai.

Filmography

References

External links
 

1937 births
2003 deaths
Sri Lankan film actresses
Sinhalese actresses
People from Kandy District
Sri Lankan film producers